The 1911 Utah Agricultural Aggies football team was an American football team that represented Utah Agricultural College (later renamed Utah State University) as an independent during the 1911 college football season. In their third season under head coach Clayton Teetzel, the Aggies compiled a 4–0–1 record, shut out all five opponents, and outscored opponents by a total of 144 to 0.

Schedule

References

Utah Agricultural
Utah State Aggies football seasons
Utah State Aggies football